Galilei is a surname, and may refer to:

Galileo Galilei (1564–1642), astronomer, philosopher, and physicist.
Vincenzo Galilei (1520–1591), composer, lutenist, and music theorist; father of Galileo
Michelagnolo Galilei (1575–1631), Baroque lutenist and composer, brother of Galileo
Alessandro Galilei (1691–1736), Florentine mathematician and architect

Two craters have been named for Galileo Galilei, with a different spelling:
Galilaei (lunar crater), on the Moon
Galilaei (Martian crater), on Mars

See also
Galilei number
Galilei Donna
Galilei ja kadonneet lelut
Galilean § Other meanings

Surnames